Smita Bansal (born 21 February 1977) is an Indian television and Bollywood film actress. Her notable roles include the Zee TV's Amanat, Aashirwad, Sarhadein and Sony SAB's Aladdin – Naam Toh Suna Hoga. She has also acted in the 2008 Bollywood film Karzzzz. She won ITA Award for Best Actress in a Supporting Role and Indian Telly Award for Best Actress in a Supporting Role for the serial Balika Vadhu.

Filmography

Films
 1998: Daya (Malayalam) as Princess
 2000: Hum To Mohabbat Karega as Sanjana , Press Reporter 
 2008: Karzzzz (Hindi) as Jyoti Verma / Pinky

Television

Theater
 Get Rid Of My Wife with Paritosh Painter

Accolades

See also
 List of Indian television actresses

References

External links 

 
 

Living people
Indian television actresses
1977 births
Actresses in Malayalam cinema
Actresses in Hindi cinema
Fear Factor: Khatron Ke Khiladi participants